The 2023 UNLV Rebels football team will represent the University of Nevada, Las Vegas as a member of the Mountain West Conference during the 2023 NCAA Division I FBS football season. The Rebels expect to be led by Barry Odom in his first year as UNLV's head coach. The Rebels will play their home games at Allegiant Stadium in Paradise, Nevada.

Schedule

References

UNLV
UNLV Rebels football seasons
UNLV Rebels football